The Possessed is a 1988 French drama film directed by Andrzej Wajda and starring Isabelle Huppert. It was entered into the 38th Berlin International Film Festival.

Cast
 Isabelle Huppert as Maria Sjatov
 Jutta Lampe as Maria Lebjadkin
 Philippine Leroy-Beaulieu as Lisa
 Bernard Blier as Le Gouverneur
 Jean-Philippe Écoffey as Peter Verchovenskij
 Laurent Malet as Kirillov
 Jerzy Radziwiłowicz as Sjatov
 Omar Sharif as Stepan
 Lambert Wilson as Nikolaj Stavrogin
 Philippe Chambon as Chigalev
 Jean-Quentin Châtelain as Virguinski
 Rémi Martin as Erkel
 Serge Spira as Fedka
 Wladimir Yordanoff as Lebjadkin
 Zbigniew Zamachowski as Liamchine
 Piotr Machalica as Maurice
 Bożena Dykiel as Virginska
 Krzysztof Kumor as Aide de campe
 Witold Skaruch as Secrétaire du Gouverneur
 Tadeusz Łomnicki as Captaine

See also
 Isabelle Huppert on screen and stage

References

External links

1988 films
1988 drama films
French drama films
1980s French-language films
Films directed by Andrzej Wajda
Films based on works by Fyodor Dostoyevsky
Films based on Russian novels
Films with screenplays by Jean-Claude Carrière
Films produced by Margaret Ménégoz
1980s French films